The aircraft diesel engine or aero diesel is a diesel-powered aircraft engine. They were used in airships and tried in aircraft in the late 1920s and 1930s, but never widely adopted until recently. Their main advantages are their excellent specific fuel consumption, the reduced flammability and somewhat higher density of their fuel, but these have been outweighed by a combination of inherent disadvantages compared to gasoline-fueled or turboprop engines. The ever-rising cost of avgas and doubts about its future availability have spurred a resurgence in aircraft diesel engine production in the early 2010s.
 
Using diesel engines in aircraft is additionally advantageous from the standpoint of environmental protection as well as the protection of human health, since the tetraethyllead antiknock ingredient of avgas has long been known to be highly toxic as well as polluting.

Development

Early diesel aircraft
A number of manufacturers built diesel aero engines in the 1920s and 1930s; the best known were the Packard air-cooled radial, and the Junkers Jumo 205, which was moderately successful, but proved unsuitable for combat use in World War II. The Blohm & Voss BV 138 trimotor maritime patrol flying boat, however, was powered with the more developed Junkers Jumo 207 powerplant, and was more successful with its trio of diesel Jumo 207s conferring upwards of a maximum 2,100 km (1,300 mile) combat radius upon the nearly 300 examples of the BV 138 built during World War II.

The first successful diesel engine developed specifically for aircraft was the Packard DR-980 radial diesel of 1928–1929, which was laid out in the familiar air-cooled radial format similar to Wright and Pratt & Whitney designs, and was contemporary with the Beardmore Tornado used in the R101 airship. The use of a diesel had been specified for its low fire risk fuel.  The first successful flight of a diesel powered aircraft was made on September 18, 1928, in a Stinson model SM-1DX Detroiter registration number X7654. Around 1936 the heavier but less thirsty diesel engines were preferred over gasoline engines when flight time was over only 6–7 hours.

Entering service in the early 1930s, the two-stroke Junkers Jumo 205 opposed-piston engine was much more widely used than previous aero diesels. It was moderately successful in its use in the Blohm & Voss Ha 139 and even more so in airship use.  In Britain Napier & Son license-built the larger Junkers Jumo 204 as the Napier Culverin, but it did not see production use in this form.  A Daimler-Benz diesel engine was also used in Zeppelins, including the ill-fated LZ 129 Hindenburg.  This engine proved unsuitable in military applications and subsequent German aircraft engine development concentrated on gasoline and jet engines.

The Soviet World War II-era four-engine strategic bomber Petlyakov Pe-8 was built with Charomskiy ACh-30 diesel engines; but just after the war's end, both its diesels, and gasoline-fueled Mikulin inline V12 engines for surviving Pe-8 airframes were replaced with Shvetsov-designed radial gasoline engines because of efficiency concerns. The Yermolaev Yer-2 long-range medium bomber was also built with Charomskiy diesel engines.

Other manufacturers also experimented with diesel engines in this period, such as the French Bloch (later Dassault Aviation), whose MB203 bomber prototype used Clerget diesels of radial design.  The Royal Aircraft Establishment developed an experimental compression ignition (diesel) version of the Rolls-Royce Condor in 1932, flying it in a Hawker Horsley for test purposes.

Postwar development
Interest in diesel engines in the postwar period was sporadic. The lower power-to-weight ratio of diesels, particularly compared to turboprop engines, weighed against the diesel engine. With fuel available cheaply and most research interest in turboprops and jets for high-speed airliners, diesel-powered aircraft virtually disappeared.  The stagnation of the general aviation market in the 1990s saw a massive decline in the development of any new aircraft engine types.

Napier & Son in Britain had developed the Napier Culverin, a derivative of the Junkers Jumo 205, before World War II, and took up aero diesel engines again in the 1950s.  The British Air Ministry supported the development of the  Napier Nomad, a combination of piston and turboprop engines, which was exceptionally efficient in terms of brake specific fuel consumption, but judged too bulky and complex and canceled in 1955.

Modern developments
Several factors have emerged to change this equation. First, a number of new manufacturers of general aviation aircraft developing new designs have emerged.  Second, in Europe in particular, avgas has become very expensive. Third, in several (particularly remote) locations, avgas is harder to obtain than diesel fuel.  Finally, automotive diesel technologies have improved greatly in recent years, offering higher power-to-weight ratios more suitable for aircraft application.

Certified diesel-powered light planes are currently available, and a number of companies are developing new engine and aircraft designs for the purpose. Many of these run on readily available jet fuel (kerosene), or on conventional automotive diesel.

Simulations indicate lower maximum payload due to the heavier engine, but also longer range at medium payload.

Applications

Airships

The zeppelins LZ 129 Hindenburg and LZ 130 Graf Zeppelin II were propelled by reversible diesel engines. The direction of operation was changed by shifting gears on the camshaft. From full power forward, the engines could be brought to a stop, changed over, and brought to full power in reverse in less than 60 seconds.

Nevil Shute Norway wrote that the demonstration flight of the airship R100 was changed from India to Canada, "when she got petrol engines, because it was thought that a flight to the tropics with petrol on board would be too hazardous. It is curious after over twenty years to recall how afraid everyone was of petrol in those days (c. 1929), because since then aeroplanes with petrol engines have done innumerable hours of flying in the tropics, and they don't burst into flames on every flight. I think the truth is that everyone was diesel-minded in those days; it seemed as if the diesel engine for aeroplanes was only just around the corner, with the promise of great fuel economy".

Hence, the ill-fated diesel-engined R101 — which crashed in 1930 — was to fly to India, though her diesel engines had petrol starter engines, and there had only been time to replace one with a diesel starter engine. The R101 used the Beardmore Tornado aero diesel engine, with two of the five engines reversible by an adjustment to the camshaft. This engine was developed from an engine used in railcars.

Certified engines

Technify Motors

The Centurion 4.0 is a four stroke  8‐cylinder, with common rail, 2 turbochargers, 1:1.689 reduction gearbox, propeller governor and FADEC weighting  and certified on 26 September 2007 for up to  maximum,  continuous at 3900 rpm. The centurion 4.0 V8 has not been certified for installation in any airframes.

EASA certified on 20 June 2017, the Centurion 3.0 is a  four stroke V6, also with common rail, turbocharger, Electronic Engine Control Unit (EECU) and 1 : 1.66 reduction gearbox, weighting  and outputting 221 kW (300 HP) at take‐off, 202 kW (272 HP) continuously, both at 2340 propeller RPM.

Thielert
Thielert, based in German Lichtenstein, Saxony was the original TC holder of the 1.7 based on the Mercedes A-class turbo diesel, running on diesel and jet A-1 fuel. It was certified for retrofitting to Cessna 172s and Piper Cherokees, replacing the  Lycoming O-320  Avgas engine.
The  of the  1.7 engine is similar to the O-320 but its displacement is less than a third and it achieves maximum power at 2300 prop RPM instead of 2700.

Robin Aircraft also offered a DR400 Ecoflyer with the Thielert engine.

In May 2008, Thielert went bankrupt and although Thielert's insolvency administrator, Bruno M. Kubler, was able to announce in January 2009 that the company was "in the black and working to capacity," by then Cessna had dropped plans to install Thielert engines in some models, and Diamond Aircraft has now developed its own in-house diesel engine: the Austro Engine E4.
Several hundred Thielert-powered airplanes are flying.

SMA Engines
A  SR305-260 was certified in February 2019.
The SR305-230 obtained US FAA certification in July 2002. It is now certified as retrofit on several Cessna 182 models in Europe and the US, and Maule is working toward certification of the M-9-230. SMA's engineering team came from Renault Sport (Formula 1) and designed it from the ground up.

SMA develops a  six cylinder version, the SR460. (2.5 kW/kg) power density with a specific fuel consumption of 0.35 lb/hp/hr (210 g/kwh).

Austro Engine
Austro Engine GmbH, based in Wiener Neustadt, Austria had the E4 engine certified by EASA on 28 January 2009. It is a 4-cylinder, 1991 cm³ four stroke engine with common rail direct injection, turbocharger, 1:1.69 reduction gearbox and an Electronic Engine Control Unit.

In 2011, Austro Engine was developing a  6-cylinder in cooperation with Steyr Motors, based on their  block, to be used in the Diamond DA50.

DieselJet
In 2016, DieselJet was developing a  TDA CR 3.0 24V.

Continental Motors 
It is developed from the SMA SR305-230.

RED Aircraft
RED Aircraft GmbH of Adenau, Germany, obtained EASA type certification on 19 December 2014 for its  RED A03 V12 four stroke, with common rail, turbocharger, 1:1.88 reduction gearbox and single lever FADEC/EECS, outputting 368 kW (500 hp) at take-off at 2127 propeller RPM and 338 kW (460 hp) at 1995 propeller RPM continuously for  dry.
The RED A05 is a 3550cc V6 preliminary design, outputting  at takeoff at 2127 propeller RPM and  continuously at 1995 propeller RPM, with a  best brake specific fuel consumption.

Experimental engines
A number of other manufacturers are currently developing experimental diesel engines, many using aircraft-specific designs rather than adapted automotive engines.  Many are using two-stroke designs, with some opposed-piston layouts directly inspired by the original Junkers design.

Diesel Air Limited, Wilksch and Zoche have all had considerable problems bringing their prototype designs into production, with delays running into several years. The Diesel Air Limited-powered airship is no longer registered by the Civil Aviation Authority in the UK.

Two-stroke
Wilksch Airmotive, a British company, is developing a  three-cylinder two-stroke diesel (WAM-120) and is working on a four-cylinder  design (WAM-160). In 2007 Wilksch claimed that they had completed multiple tests on the WAM-100 LSA in accordance with ASTM F 2538 – the WAM-100 LSA is a derated WAM-120. Wilksch originally showed a two-cylinder prototype alongside the three- and four-cylinder models. In April 2008 IndUS Aviation introduced the first diesel light-sport aircraft with a WAM 120 having flown 400 hours on a Thorp T211 in England for the past four years.
By mid-2009, approximately 40 WAM-120 units had been sold, with around half currently flying.

Using a ported two-stroke design, they have also flown a prototype engine in a pusher configuration. Velocity aircraft are claiming delivery of non-certified engines since 2005 and hope to achieve certification early in 2011. DeltaHawk engines have a dry oil sump, so they can run in any orientation: upright, inverted or vertical shaft by changing the location of the oil scavenge port. They can also run counter-rotation for installation in twins to eliminate the critical engine issue.
A water-cooled DeltaHawk engine has been successfully fitted to a Rotorway helicopter, weighing the same as an air-cooled petrol engine of similar power and being capable of maintaining that power to 17,000 feet.

GAP Diesel Engine is a NASA development.

With the branding Zoche aero-diesel, the company "Michael Zoche Antriebstechnik" in Munich/Germany has produced a prototype range of three radial air-cooled two-stroke diesel aero-engines, comprising a V-twin, a single-row cross-4 and a double-row cross-8.
A Zoche engine has run successfully in wind tunnel tests. Zoche seem barely closer to production than they were a decade ago.

The  v12 can power generators, tanks, boats or blimps and v4 and v8 versions can be derived.

Opposed-piston engines
The Bourke engine, designed by Russell Bourke, of Petaluma, CA, is an opposed rigidly connected twin cylinder design using the detonation principle.

Diesel Air Limited is a British company developing a  twin-cylinder (therefore four-piston), two-stroke opposed-piston engine inspired by the original Junkers design. Their engine has flown in test aircraft and airship installations. Unlike the Junkers, it is made for horizontal installation with a central output shaft for the geared cranks, the overall installed shape thereby approximately resembling a four-stroke flat-four engine.

Powerplant Developments, a British company, is developing a  opposed-piston engine called the Gemini 100/120 that resembles the Diesel Air Limited engine and uses the Junkers twin-crank principle, again for horizontal installation with a central output shaft for the geared cranks. However, the Gemini 100 is an engine. Like Diesel Air Limited, Powerplant Developments claim to be using Weslake Air Services for production. They have recently announced that Tecnam will test a prototype with the Gemini engine.

Superior Air Parts' subsidiary Gemini Diesel develops three cylinder two-stroke designs with six opposed pistons, a 100 hp (75 kW) weighing 159.5 lb (72.5 kg), and a turbocharged 125 hp (118 kW) weighing 175 lb (72.5 kg), both measuring 23” wide × 16” high × 23” long (58 × 40 cm × 58 cm) and reaching  BSFC, respectively; while larger three cylinder, six pistons engine would produce 180-200 hp (134-149 kW) whilst weighing 276 lb (125 kg) in 29” W × 16” H × 29” L (73 × 41.5 × 72.5 cm) and 300-360 HP (224-268 KW) turbocharged whilst weighing 386 lb (175 kg) within 29” W × 19” H × 37” L (73 × 47.5 × 95 cm), while five cylinders, 10 pistons would produce 450 hp (336 kW) whilst weighing 474 lb (215 kg) within 29” W × 22” H × 43 ” L (73 × 55 × 110 cm) and six cylinder, 12 pistons engines would attain 550 hp (410 kW) whilst weighing 551 pounds (250 kg in 29” W × 22” H × 48” L (73 × 55 × 122 cm), burning  The 100 hp version will cost less than $25,000.

Weslake Engine, another UK based company, displayed its A80 lightweight diesel engine at Friedrichshafen Aero 2015.

Four-stroke
Wisconsin-based Engineered Propulsion Systems develops its Graflight liquid-cooled V-8 engine with steel pistons and compacted graphite iron crankcase for better strength and durability than aluminum at similar weight, increasing time between overhauls to 3,000 hours. It is managed by a Bosch ECU and consumes Jet A, JP-8 or straight diesel for general aviation aircraft and small helicopters, military drones, small boats or troop carriers, and its low vibration allows the use of composite or aluminum airscrews.
At , 75% of the  maximum power, it consumes , in comparison to the Continental TSIO-550-E, which burns

Automotive derived
Raptor Turbo Diesel LLC, an American company, is currently developing the Raptor 105 diesel engine. It is a four-stroke inline turbo charged engine. Formerly Vulcan Aircraft Engines (until September 2007).

ECO Motors developed the EM 80 and EM  4 stroke 4 cylinder diesel with FADEC based on a car engine for  dry but disappeared since 2008.

The FlyEco diesel is a three-cylinder,  engine producing 80 HP / 58,8 kW up to 3,800 RPM and reduced by 1:1.50-1.79, derived from the Smart Car.
It powers the Siemens-FlyEco Magnus eFusion hybrid electric aircraft.

Teos/Austro Engine AE440

Within the Green Rotorcraft European Clean Sky Joint Technology Initiative environmental research program started in 2011, an Airbus Helicopters H120 Colibri technology demonstrator equipped with a HIPE AE440 high-compression diesel engine, running on jet fuel, first flew on 6 November 2015. The powerplant is a liquid-cooled, dry sump lubricated  90° V8 engine with  common rail direct injection, fully machined aluminum blocks, titanium connecting rods, steel pistons and liners, one turbocharger per cylinder bank.

With an air/air intercooler, it weighs  (dry) without gearbox and the  installed powerpack weighs . Its brake specific fuel consumption is 200 g/kW.h. It is manufactured by Teos Powertrain Engineering, a joint venture between Mecachrome and D2T (IFPEN group) for the mechanical design, engine main parts manufacturing, assembly and testing and Austro Engine for the dual channel FADEC and harness, fuel system, airworthiness.

See also
 List of aircraft engines

References

External links

 
 
 

Aircraft engines
Diesel engines